Alpha-1,3-mannosyl-glycoprotein 4-beta-N-acetylglucosaminyltransferase (N-acetylglucosaminyltransferase IV, N-glycosyl-oligosaccharide-glycoprotein N-acetylglucosaminyltransferase IV, beta-acetylglucosaminyltransferase IV, uridine diphosphoacetylglucosamine-glycopeptide beta4-acetylglucosaminyltransferase IV, alpha-1,3-mannosylglycoprotein beta-1,4-N-acetylglucosaminyltransferase, GnTIV) is an enzyme with systematic name UDP-N-acetyl-D-glucosamine:3-(2-(N-acetyl-beta-D-glucosaminyl)-alpha-D-mannosyl)-glycoprotein 4-beta-N-acetyl-D-glucosaminyltransferase. This enzyme catalyses the following chemical reaction

 UDP-N-acetyl-D-glucosamine + 3-(2-[N-acetyl-beta-D-glucosaminyl]-alpha-D-mannosyl)-beta-D-mannosyl-R  UDP + 3-(2,4-bis[N-acetyl-beta-D-glucosaminyl]-alpha-D-mannosyl)-beta-D-mannosyl-R

R represents the remainder of the N-linked oligosaccharide in the glycoprotein acceptor.

References

External links 
 

EC 2.4.1